James William Kirkland (born 30 October 1946) was a Scottish professional footballer who played as a left-back.

References

External links
Post War English & Scottish Football League A–Z Player's Transfer Database profile

1946 births
Sportspeople from Bedford
English footballers
Association football fullbacks
Birkenshaw Amateurs F.C. players
Aberdeen F.C. players
Grimsby Town F.C. players
English Football League players
Scottish Football League players
Living people
Footballers from Bedfordshire